This is a list of drama films of the 1960s.

1960
 L'avventura
 Ballad of a Soldier
 Breathless
 Cruel Story of Youth
 Devi
 Elmer Gantry
 The Entertainer
 Her Brother
 The Human Condition, Part 2: The Road to Eternity
 Inherit the Wind
 Late Autumn
 Night and Fog in Japan
 Rocco and His Brothers
 The Sundowners
 Sunrise at Campobello
 The Sun's Burial
 Le Trou
 Two Women
 The Virgin Spring
 When a Woman Ascends the Stairs

1961
 Accattone
 Ada
 The Children's Hour
 Connection
 Human Condition, Part 3: A Soldier's Prayer
 The Hustler
 The Island
 Judgment at Nuremberg
 Last Year at Marienbad
 Lola
 The Misfits
 A Raisin in the Sun
 Splendor in the Grass
 A Taste of Honey
 Through a Glass Darkly
 We Were Young

1962
 Advise & Consent
 All Fall Down
 Billy Budd
 Birdman of Alcatraz
 Cleo from 5 to 7
 Days of Wine and Roses
 L'eclisse
 Harakiri
 The Intruder
 Jules and Jim
 Knife in the Water
 Lawrence of Arabia
 Lolita
 The Loneliness of the Long Distance Runner
 Lonely are the Brave
 Long Day's Journey into Night
 The Miracle Worker
 My Life to Live
 Ningen
 Pitfall
 Requiem for a Heavyweight
 To Kill a Mockingbird
 Winter Light

1963
 An Actor's Revenge
 America, America
 Contempt
 Le Feu Follet
 High and Low
 Hud
 The Leopard
 Lilies of the Field
 Lord of the Flies
 Muriel
 Raven's End
 The Servant
 Shock Corridor
 The Silence
 Smrt Si Rika Engelchen
 This Sporting Life
 Vidas Secas

1964
 Black God, White Devil
 The Carpetbaggers
 Charulata
 Gamlet
 Gate of Flesh
 Gertrud
 The Gospel According to St. Matthew
 I Am Cuba
 Intentions of Murder
 The Night of the Iguana
 Nothing But a Man
 One Potato, Two Potato
 The Pawnbroker
 The Pumpkin Eater
 Red Desert
 Séance on a Wet Afternoon
 Zorba the Greek

1965
 The Agony and the Ecstasy
 Chimes at Midnight
 The Cincinnati Kid
 Othello
 The Round-Up
 Shadows of Forgotten Ancestors
 Ship of Fools
 The Shop on Main Street

1966
 7 Women
 Akai Tenshi
 Andrei Rublev
 The Battle of Algiers
 Au Hasard Balthazar
 Masculin, féminin
 Persona
 Two or Three Things I Know About Her
 Violence at Noon
 Who's Afraid of Virginia Woolf?
 Wings
 Yesterday Girl
 Young Torless

1967
 The ABC of Love
 Accident
 Belle de jour
 The Commissar
 Cool Hand Luke
 Far From the Madding Crowd
 I Am Curious (Yellow)
 In Cold Blood
 A Man Vanishes
 Marat/Sade
 Mouchette
 Rece do góry
 The Red and the White
 Skupljaci Perja
 The Trip

1968
 Faces
 The Heart Is a Lonely Hunter
 Here, Beneath the North Star
 I Am Curious (Blue)
 If....
 Lost Sex
 Memories of Underdevelopment
 Nanami, The Inferno of First Love
 Rachel, Rachel
 Romeo and Juliet
 Shame
 The Swimmer
 The Unfaithful Wife
 Witchfinder General

1969
 Anne of the Thousand Days
 Blind Beast
 The Color of Pomegranates
 The Damned
 Double Suicide
 Easy Rider
 Fellini Satyricon
 A Gentle Woman
 Katzelmacher
 Kes
 Learning Tree
 Love Is Colder Than Death
 Medium Cool
 The Prayer for Katarina Horovitzova
 The Prime of Miss Jean Brodie
 Retaliation
 Shōnen
 They Shoot Horses, Don't They?
 This Man Must Die
 A Touch of Zen
 Women in Love

References

Drama
1960s